Test cricket is the oldest form of cricket played at international level. A Test match is scheduled to take place over a period of five days, and is played by teams representing full member nations of the International Cricket Council (ICC).
This is a list of West Indies Test cricket records.  It is based on the List of Test cricket records, but concentrates solely on records dealing with the West Indian Test cricket team, and any cricketers who have played for that team.

Key
The top five records are listed for each category, except for the team wins, losses, draws and ties and the partnership records. Tied records for fifth place are also included. Explanations of the general symbols and cricketing terms used in the list are given below. Specific details are provided in each category where appropriate. All records include matches played for West Indies only, and are correct .

Team records

Team wins, losses, draws and ties 
, West Indies played 571 Test matches resulting in 182 victories, 208 defeats, 180 draws and 1 tie for an overall winning percentage of 31.87.

First Test series wins

First Test match wins

Team scoring records

Most runs in an innings
The highest innings total scored in Test cricket came in the series between Sri Lanka and India in August 1997. Playing in the first Test at R. Premadasa Stadium in Colombo, the hosts posted a first innings total of 6/952d. This broke the longstanding record of 7/903d which England set against Australia in the final Test of the 1938 Ashes series at The Oval. The third Test of the 1958 series against Pakistan saw West Indies set their highest innings total of 790/3d.

Highest successful run chases
West Indies' highest fourth innings total is 418/7 in a successful run chase against Australia at St. John's in May 2003 which is also the highest successful run chase.

Fewest runs in an innings
The lowest innings total scored in Test cricket came in the second Test of England's tour of New Zealand in March 1955. Trailing England by 46, New Zealand was bowled out in their second innings for 26 runs. The lowest score in Test history for West Indies is 47 against England in the second innings of the first Test of the English cricket team in the West Indies in 2003-04.

Most runs conceded in an innings
The highest innings total scored against West Indies is by England when they scored 849 in the fourth Test of the England's tour of `West Indies in 1930 at Sabina Park.

Fewest runs conceded in an innings
The lowest innings total scored against West Indies is 43 in the first test of Bangladesh's tour of West Indies in 2018

Result records
A Test match is won when one side has scored more runs than the total runs scored by the opposing side during their two innings. If both sides have completed both their allocated innings and the side that fielded last has the higher aggregate of runs, it is known as a win by runs. This indicates the number of runs that they had scored more than the opposing side. If one side scores more runs in a single innings than the total runs scored by the other side in both their innings, it is known as a win by innings and runs. If the side batting last wins the match, it is known as a win by wickets, indicating the number of wickets that were still to fall.

Greatest win margins (by innings)
The fifth Test of the 1938 Ashes series at The Oval saw England win by an innings and 579 runs, the largest victory by an innings in Test cricket history. The largest victory for West Indies, which is the third largest, is there win against India in the third Test of the 1958–59 tour at the Eden Gardens, where the hosts lost by an innings and 336 runs.

Greatest win margins (by runs)
The greatest winning margin by runs in Test cricket was England's victory over Australia by 675 runs in the first Test of the 1928–29 Ashes series. The largest victory recorded by West Indies, which is the seventh largest victory, is the third Test of the 1976 tour by 425 runs against England at Old Trafford, Manchester.

Greatest win margins (by 10 wickets)
West Indies have won a Test match by a margin of 10 wickets on 28 occasions.

Narrowest win margins (by runs)
The narrowest win is West Indies' one-run win over Australia in 1993.

Narrowest win margins (by wickets)
West Indies' narrowest win by wickets is by 1 wicket, which they have achieved thrice, has come in the third Test of the 1998-99 Australia tour at Kensington Oval, Barbados and twice against Pakistan, once Pakistan's tour in 2000 at Antigua Recreation Ground, St. John's and during the 2021 tour at Sabina Park, Kingston. These are three of only fifteen one-wicket victories in Test cricket.

Greatest loss margins (by innings)
The Oval in London played host to the greatest defeat by an innings in Test cricket. The final Test of the 1938 Ashes saw England defeat the tourists by an innings and 579 runs, to the draw the series at one match all. West Indies biggest defeat came during the Wisden Trophy in 2007 when they lost by an innings and 283 runs at Headingley, Leeds.

Greatest loss margins (by runs)
The first Test of the 1928–29 Ashes series saw Australia defeated by England by 675 runs, the greatest losing margin by runs in Test cricket. West Indies biggest defeat by runs was 419 against Australia in the second Test of the 2022 tour of Australia at the Adelaide Oval.

Greatest loss margins (by 10 wickets)
West Indies have lost a Test match by a margin of 10 wickets on 16 occasions with most recent being during the 2nd test of the West Indies tour of India in 2018.

Narrowest loss margins (by runs)
The narrowest loss of West Indies in terms of runs is by 26 runs against England in the fifth test of the England's tour of West Indies in 1974.

Narrowest loss margins (by wickets)
The narrowest loss of West Indies in terms of wickets is by 1 wicket twice. First such loss came against Australia in the fourth test of West Indies tour of Australia in 1951-52 and the other one came against New Zealand in the first test of West Indies tour of New Zealand in 1979–80.

Tied matches 

A tie can occur when the scores of both teams are equal at the conclusion of play, provided that the side batting last has completed their innings. Only two matches have ended in a tie in Test cricket history, both of which involved Australia.

Individual records

Batting records

Most career runs
A run is the basic means of scoring in cricket.
India's Sachin Tendulkar has scored the most runs in Test cricket with 15,921. Second is Ricky Ponting of Australia with 13,378 ahead of Jacques Kallis from South Africa in third with 13,289. Brian Lara and Shivnarine Chanderpaul are the only two West Indian batsmen who have scored more than 10,000 runs in Test cricket.

Fastest runs getter

Most runs in each batting position

Most runs against each team

Highest individual score
The first Test of the 2003–04 series of the Southern Cross Trophy, contested between Australia and Zimbabwe, at the WACA Ground saw Matthew Hayden of Australia set the highest Test score with 380, surpassing the West Indies' Brian Lara's 375 scored against England in April 1994 at the Antigua Recreation Ground. Six months later, during the last test of the England's tour of West Indies in 2003-04 Brian Lara scored the first ever quadruple century and reclaim the world record for highest Individual score.

Highest individual score against each team

Highest individual score – progression of record

Highest career average
A batsman's batting average is the total number of runs they have scored divided by the number of times they have been dismissed.

Highest Average in each batting position

Most half-centuries
A half-century is a score of between 50 and 99 runs. Statistically, once a batsman's score reaches 100, it is no longer considered a half-century but a century.

Sachin Tendulkar of India has scored the most half-centuries in Test cricket with 68. He is followed by the West Indies' Shivnarine Chanderpaul on 66, India's Rahul Dravid and Allan Border of Australia on 63 and in fifth with 62 fifties to his name, Australia's Ricky Ponting.

Most centuries
A century is a score of 100 or more runs in a single innings.

Tendulkar has also scored the most centuries in Test cricket with 51. South Africa's Jacques Kallis is next on 45 and Ricky Ponting with 41 hundreds is in third. Brian Lara is the highest West Indian on this list with 34 centuries.

Most double centuries
A double century is a score of 200 or more runs in a single innings.

Bradman holds the Test record for the most double centuries scored with twelve, one ahead of Sri Lanka's Kumar Sangakkara who finished his career with eleven. In third is Brian Lara of the West Indies with nine. England's Wally Hammond and Mahela Jayawardene of Sri Lanka both scored seven and Kohli is one of seven cricketers who reached the mark on six occasions.

Most triple centuries
A triple century is a score of 300 or more runs in a single innings.

Lara and Gayle hold the equal Test record for the most triple centuries scored with two, along with Australia's Don Bradman and India's Virender Sehwag.

Most Sixes

Most Fours

Most runs in a series
The 1930 Ashes series in England saw Don Bradman set the record for the most runs scored in a single series, falling just 26 short of 1,000 runs. He is followed by Wally Hammond with 905 runs scored in the 1928–29 Ashes series. Vivian Richards with 829 runs in the 1976 tour of England is the highest West Indian on the list.

Most ducks in career
A duck refers to a batsman being dismissed without scoring a run. Courtney Walsh holds the record for highest number of ducks in Test cricket.

Bowling records

Most career wickets
A bowler takes the wicket of a batsman when the form of dismissal is bowled, caught, leg before wicket, stumped or hit wicket. If the batsman is dismissed by run out, obstructing the field, handling the ball, hitting the ball twice or timed out the bowler does not receive credit.

West Indies' Courtney Walsh is the first fast bowler to take 500 Test wickets. He is sixth on the list of bowlers with most wickets, with 519 wickets. James Anderson of England is fourth on the list with 600 wickets .

Most wickets against each team

Fastest wicket taker

Best figures in an innings
Bowling figures refers to the number of the wickets a bowler has taken and the number of runs conceded.
There have been two occasions in Test cricket where a bowler has taken all ten wickets in a single innings – Jim Laker of England took 10/53 against Australia in 1956 and India's Anil Kumble in 1999 returned figures of 10/74 against Pakistan. Jack Noreiga is one of 15 bowlers who have taken nine wickets in a Test match innings.

Best bowling figures against each team

Best figures in a match
A bowler's bowling figures in a match is the sum of the wickets taken and the runs conceded over both innings.

No bowler in the history of Test cricket has taken all 20 wickets in a match. The closest to do so was English spin bowler Jim Laker. During the fourth Test of the 1956 Ashes series, Laker took 9/37 in the first innings and 10/53 in the second to finish with match figures of 19/90. Michael Holding's figures of 14/149, taken during the fifth match of the West Indies tour of England in 1976, is the 19th-best in Test cricket history.

Best career average
A bowler's bowling average is the total number of runs they have conceded divided by the number of wickets they have taken.
Nineteenth century English medium pacer George Lohmann holds the record for the best career average in Test cricket with 10.75. J. J. Ferris, one of fifteen cricketers to have played Test cricket for more than one team, is second behind Lohmann with an overall career average of 12.70 runs per wicket.

Best career economy rate
A bowler's economy rate is the total number of runs they have conceded divided by the number of overs they have bowled.
English bowler William Attewell, who played 10 matches for England between 1884 and 1892, holds the Test record for the best career economy rate with 1.31. West Indies's Gerry Gomez, with a rate of 1.82 runs per over conceded over his 29-match Test career, is ninth on the list.

Best career strike rate
A bowler's strike rate is the total number of balls they have bowled divided by the number of wickets they have taken.
As with the career average above, the top bowler with the best Test career strike rate is George Lohmann with strike rate of 34.1 balls per wicket. West Indies's Jermaine Lawson is at 18th position in this list.

Most five-wicket hauls in an innings
A five-wicket haul refers to a bowler taking five wickets in a single innings.
Malcolm Marshall, Curtly Ambrose and Courtney Walsh are joint-17th on the list of most five-wicket hauls in Test cricket.

Most ten-wicket hauls in a match
A ten-wicket haul refers to a bowler taking ten or more wickets in a match over two innings.
As with the five-wicket hauls above, Marshall is the highest West Indian in taking the most ten-wicket hauls in Test cricket.

Worst figures in an innings
The worst figures in a single innings in Test cricket came in the third Test between the West Indies at home to Pakistan in 1958. Pakistan's Khan Mohammad returned figures of 0/259 from his 54 overs in the second innings of the match. 
The worst figures by a West Indian is 0/148 that came off the bowling of Shannon Gabriel in the first test of the West Indies's tour of New Zealand in 2013.

Worst figures in a match
The worst figures in a match in Test cricket were returned by South Africa's Imran Tahir in the second Test against Australia at the Adelaide Oval in November 2012. He had figures of 0/180 off his 23 overs in the first innings and 0/80 off his 14 overs in the third innings, for a total of 0/260 from 37 overs.

The worst figures by a West Indian is by Rajindra Dhanraj in the fifth test of the West Indies's tour of England in 1995.

Most wickets in a series
England's seventh Test tour of South Africa in 1913–14 saw the record set for the most wickets taken by a bowler in a Test series. English paceman Sydney Barnes played in four of the five matches and achieved a total of 49 wickets to his name. West Indies's Malcolm Marshall is joint 18th with his 35 wickets taken against England during the 1988 tour.

Hat-trick
In cricket, a hat-trick occurs when a bowler takes three wickets with consecutive deliveries. The deliveries may be interrupted by an over bowled by another bowler from the other end of the pitch or the other team's innings, but must be three consecutive deliveries by the individual bowler in the same match. Only wickets attributed to the bowler count towards a hat-trick; run outs do not count.
In Test cricket history there have been just 44 hat-tricks, the first achieved by Fred Spofforth for Australia against England in 1879. In 1912, Australian Jimmy Matthews achieved the feat twice in one game against South Africa. The only other players to achieve two hat-tricks are Australia's Hugh Trumble, against England in 1902 and 1904, Pakistan's Wasim Akram, in separate games against Sri Lanka in 1999, and England's Stuart Broad.

Wicket-keeping records
The wicket-keeper is a specialist fielder who stands behind the stumps being guarded by the batsman on strike and is the only member of the fielding side allowed to wear gloves and leg pads.

Most career dismissals
A wicket-keeper can be credited with the dismissal of a batsman in two ways, caught or stumped. A fair catch is taken when the ball is caught fully within the field of play without it bouncing after the ball has touched the striker's bat or glove holding the bat, while a stumping occurs when the wicket-keeper puts down the wicket while the batsman is out of his ground and not attempting a run.
West Indies's Jeff Dujon is seventh in taking most dismissals in Test cricket as a designated wicket-keeper.

Most career catches
Dujon is fifth in taking most catches in Test cricket as a designated wicket-keeper.

Most career stumpings
Bert Oldfield, Australia's fifth-most capped wicket-keeper, holds the record for the most stumpings in Test cricket with 52. West Indies glovemen Ridley Jacobs and Denesh Ramdin have the most stumpings among West Indies with 12.

Most dismissals in an innings
Four wicket-keepers have taken seven dismissals in a single innings in a Test match—Wasim Bari of Pakistan in 1979, Englishman Bob Taylor in 1980, New Zealand's Ian Smith in 1991 and most recently West Indiesn gloveman Ridley Jacobs against Australia in 2000.

Most dismissals in a match
Three wicket-keepers have made 11 dismissals in a Test match, Englishman Jack Russell in 1995, South African AB de Villiers in 2013 and most recently India's Rishabh Pant against Australia in 2018.

The feat of making 10 dismissals in a match has been achieved by 4 wicket-keepers on 4 occasions.

David Murray, Courtney Browne and Ridley Jacobs have made nine dismissals in a match, the most among West Indian wicket keepers.

Most dismissals in a series
Brad Haddin holds the Test cricket record for the most dismissals taken by a wicket-keeper in a series. He took 29 catches during the 2013 Ashes series. West Indiesn record is held by Deryck Murray when he made 24 dismissals during the West Indies tour of England in 1963.

Fielding records

Most career catches
Caught is one of the nine methods a batsman can be dismissed in cricket.  The majority of catches are caught in the slips, located behind the batsman, next to the wicket-keeper, on the off side of the field. Most slip fielders are top order batsmen.

India's Rahul Dravid holds the record for the most catches in Test cricket by a non-wicket-keeper with 209, followed by Mahela Jayawardene of Sri Lanka on 205 and South African Jacques Kallis with 200. Brian Lara is the highest ranked West Indian in ninth, securing 164 catches in his Test career.

Most catches in a series
The 1920–21 Ashes series, in which Australia whitewashed England 5–0 for the first time, saw the record set for the most catches taken by a non-wicket-keeper in a Test series. Australian all-rounder Jack Gregory took 15 catches in the series as well as 23 wickets. Greg Chappell, a fellow Australian all-rounder, and India's K. L. Rahul are equal second behind Gregory with 14 catches taken during the 1974–75 Ashes series and during the 2018 Indian tour of England respectively. Four players have taken 13 catches in a series on six occasions with both Bob Simpson and Brian Lara having done so twice and Rahul Dravid and Alastair Cook once.

All-round Records

1000 runs and 100 wickets
A total of 71 players have achieved the double of 1000 runs and 100 wickets in their Test career.

250 runs and 20 wickets in a series
A total of 18 players on 24 occasions have achieved the double of 250 runs and 20 wickets in a series.

Other records

Most career matches

India's Sachin Tendulkar holds the record for the most Test matches played with 200, with former captain Shivnarine Chanderpaul being joint fifth having represented West Indies on 164 occasions.

Most consecutive career matches
Former English captain Alastair Cook holds the record for the most consecutive Test matches played with 159. He broke Allan Border's long standing record of 153 matches in June 2018. gary Sobers, widely considered to be cricket's greatest ever all-rounder, played 85 consecutive Test matches, is 12th and the highest ranked West Indies player to achieve the feat.

Most matches as captain
Graeme Smith, who led the South African cricket team from 2003 to 2014, holds the record for the most matches played as captain in Test cricket with 109.Clive Lloyd captained the West Indies between 1974 and 1985 and oversaw their rise to become the dominant Test-playing nation, a position that was only relinquished in the latter half of the 1990s is fifth on the list with 60 matches.

Youngest players on Debut
The youngest player to play in a Test match is claimed to be Hasan Raza at the age of 14 years and 227 days, though there is some doubt as to the validity of Raza's age at the time.

Oldest players on Debut
England left-arm slow bowler James Southerton is the oldest player to appear in a Test match. Playing in the very first inaugural test against Australia in 1876 at Melbourne Cricket Ground, in Melbourne, Australia, he was aged 49 years and 119 days. Nelson Betancourt is the oldest West Indian Test debutant when he played his only game during the second Test of the 1929–30 series at the Queen's Park Oval, Port of Spain.

Oldest players
England all-rounder Wilfred Rhodes is the oldest player to appear in a Test match. Playing in the fourth Test against the West Indies in 1930 at Sabina Park, in Kingston, Jamaica, he was aged 52 years and 165 days on the final day's play. The oldest West Indian Test player is George Headley who was aged 44 years and 230 days when he represented West Indies for the final time in the 1954 tour by England at Sabina Park.

Partnership records
In cricket, two batsmen are always present at the crease batting together in a partnership. This partnership will continue until one of them is dismissed, retires or the innings comes to a close.

Highest partnerships by wicket
A wicket partnership describes the number of runs scored before each wicket falls. The first wicket partnership is between the opening batsmen and continues until the first wicket falls. The second wicket partnership then commences between the not out batsman and the number three batsman. This partnership continues until the second wicket falls. The third wicket partnership then commences between the not out batsman and the new batsman. This continues down to the tenth wicket partnership. When the tenth wicket has fallen, there is no batsman left to partner so the innings is closed.

Highest partnerships by runs
The highest Test partnership by runs for any wicket is held by the Sri Lankan pairing of Kumar Sangakkara and Mahela Jayawardene who put together a third wicket partnership of 624 runs during the first Test against South Africa in July 2006. This broke the record of 576 runs set by their compatriots Sanath Jayasuriya and Roshan Mahanama against India in 1997. West Indies' Conrad Hunte and Garfield Sobers hold the seventh highest Test partnership with 446 made in 1958 against Pakistan.

Highest overall partnership runs by a pair

Umpiring records

Most matches umpired
An umpire in cricket is a person who officiates the match according to the Laws of Cricket. Two umpires adjudicate the match on the field, whilst a third umpire has access to video replays, and a fourth umpire looks after the match balls and other duties. The records below are only for on-field umpires.

Aleem Dar of Pakistan holds the record for the most Test matches umpired with 130. The current active Dar set the record in December 2019 overtaking Steve Bucknor from the West Indies mark of 128 matches. They are followed by South Africa's Rudi Koertzen who officiated in 108.

See also
 Cricket statistics
 List of Test cricket records

Notes

References

Test cricket records
West Indies in international cricket
Test cricket records